Linfoot is a surname. Notable people with the surname include:

Dan Linfoot (born 1988), British superbike rider
Edward Linfoot (1905–1982), British mathematician
Fred Linfoot (1901–1979), English footballer 
William R. Linfoot, American polo player

See also
Linafoot